Clerarcha is a genus of moths of the family Xyloryctidae.

Species
 Clerarcha agana Meyrick, 1890
 Clerarcha dryinopa Meyrick, 1890
 Clerarcha grammatistis Meyrick, 1890
 Clerarcha poliochyta Turner, 1902

References

Xyloryctidae
Xyloryctidae genera